Peter Booth (born 2 November 1952 in Shipley, West Yorkshire) is an English former cricketer active from 1972 to 1981 who played for Leicestershire. He appeared in 90 first-class matches as a righthanded batsman who bowled right arm fast medium. 

He scored 767 runs: his highest score was 58 not out to save a match against Lancashire at Leicester in 1976.  He took 162 wickets with a best performance of six for 93.

Booth was one of ten members of Leicestershire's first County Championship winning team in 1975 to have a road in Leicester named after him by the city council. Chris Balderstone, Brian Davison, Barry Dudleston, Ken Higgs, David Humphries, Ray Illingworth,
Norman McVicker, John Steele and Roger Tolchard were the others. Jack Birkenshaw, Graham McKenzie and Mick Norman missed out as there were already roads using their surnames.

Notes

1952 births
English cricketers
Leicestershire cricketers
Living people
Cricketers from Shipley, West Yorkshire